George Pitcher was a British film producer and production manager who worked in the 1950s and 1960s. He helped produce the film version of Day of the Triffids.

Select Credits
Trottie True (1949)
Curtain Up (1952)
Gift Horse (1952)
Genevieve (1953)
Always a Bride (1953)
It's Never Too Late (1956)
The Birthday Present (1957)
Happy Is the Bride (1958)
Law and Disorder (1958)
Whirlpool (1959)
A Story of David (1960)
The Day of the Triffids (1963)
Lancelot and Guinevere (1963)
The Heroes of Telemark (1965)
Georgy Girl (1966)
Charlie Bubbles (1968)

References

External links
George Pitcher at IMDb

British film producers